Bembidion aeneum is a species of ground beetle native to Europe.

References

aeneum
Beetles described in 1824
Beetles of Europe